Durudeh (also Romanized as Dūrūdeh) is a village in Hati Rural District, Hati District, Lali County, Khuzestan Province, Iran. At the 2006 census, its population was 59, in 15 families.

References 

Populated places in Lali County